Önder Doğan (born 30 January 1984), better known by his stage name Murda, is a Turkish- Dutch rapper and songwriter. He is known for his collaboration with fellow rapper Ezhel on various songs.

Discography

Studio albums
Made in Turkey (ft. Ezhel) (2020)
DOĞA (2020)
BABA (2019)
Bruin Brood (2017) (ft. BangBros & Hef)
We Doen Ons Best (2016)

Singles and EPs
İmdat (2022) (ft. Hadise)
Konum Gizli (2022) (ft. Mero)
RS (2022) (ft. Bartofso & Uzi)
Harbiye (2022) (ft. Tabitha)
LE CANE (RMX) (2022) (ft. Muti, Summer Cem, Uzi, Critical & Heijan)
Banana (2022) (ft. Kempi)
OHA (2021) (ft. Summer Cem)
Denedim (2021)
Kafeste (2021)
Gece Gündüz (2021) (ft. Mero)
Made in Turkey (2020) (ft. Ezhel)
NAPIYON LAN (2020) (ft. SFB)
Temiz (2020) (ft. Spanker & Josylvio)
Bi Sonraki Hayatımda Gel (2020) (with Ezhel)
Was machst du (2020) (ft. Eno)
Big Money (2020) (ft. Mario Cash)
Eh Baba (2020)
Nereye Kadar (2020)
AYA (2019) (ft. Ezhel)
Boynumdaki Chain (2019) (ft. Ezhel)
Blitzkrieg (2019) (ft. Carnage & NAAZAAR)
Drop Top (2019) (ft. Zefanio & Priceless)
Stretch (2019) (ft. Bizzey & Kraantje Pappie)
Paraplu (2019) (ft. Kevin)
Runnin''' (2019) (ft. Jonna Fraser)Rompe (2019) (ft. Priceless & Frenna)Pistola (2018) (ft. ICE & Yung Felix)Again (2018) (ft. Makkie)Soon (2018) (ft. Philly Moré & Frenna)Shutdown (2018) (ft. SFB)ISSA (2018) (ft. Yawenthoo & Vic9)Gasolina (2018) (ft. Lange & Djaga Djaga)Helemaal Niks (2017) (ft. BangBros & Hef)Poenie Onderweg (2017) (ft. BangBros & Hef)Wejo (2017) (ft. BangBros & Hef)Zomersessie 2017 – 101Barz (2017) (ft. BangBros & Hef)
Trabajo (2017) 
Zwaai (2017) (ft. BangBros, Hef & Bizzey)
Culé (2017)
Brand New (2017) (ft. Jonna Fraser & Jandino Asporaat)
London (2016) (ft. Raynor Bruges)
Watch Me (2016) (ft. Raynor Bruges)
Niet Zo (DJ DYLVN Remix) (2016) (with Ronnie Flex & DJ DYLVN)
Doutzen (2015) (with Psyko Punkz)
In De Wissel (2015)
De Macht (2015)
Niet Iedereen Bestaat (2015)
Stoner (2014) (with Endymion)
Love This Life (2013) (with Psyko Punkz)
Trippy Hippie (2013) (with Psyko Punkz)
FTS (2007) (with Showtek)

Charts

References

Living people
Dutch people of Turkish descent
1984 births
Dutch rappers
Turkish rappers
Turkish hip hop
Turkish lyricists
Turkish male singers
Dutch male singers